Cardiliidae is a family of bivalves belonging to the order Venerida.

Genera:
 Cardilia Deshayes, 1835

References

Venerida
Bivalve families
'